Qusheh Bolagh (also Romanized as Qūsheh Bolāgh; also known as Qūshā Bolāgh and Qūsheh Bāyrām) is a village in Abish Ahmad Rural District, Abish Ahmad District, Kaleybar County, East Azerbaijan Province, Iran. At the 2006 census, its population was 467, in 111 families.

References 

Populated places in Kaleybar County